The ECW World Tag Team Championship was a professional wrestling world tag team championship contested for in Extreme Championship Wrestling (ECW).

Originally, ECW was known as Eastern Championship Wrestling when it was a member of the National Wrestling Alliance (NWA), an organization that had numerous member promotions. ECW withdrew as a member of the NWA in 1994 and renamed itself to Extreme Championship Wrestling. The championship remained active until April 2001, when ECW filed for bankruptcy. All of ECW's assets were later purchased by World Wrestling Entertainment (WWE) in mid-2003, including the copyrights to ECW's championships.

In May 2006, WWE extended its promotion by adding ECW as a third additional brand, the others being Raw and SmackDown!, in a storyline sports extension. The ECW World Heavyweight Championship was the only former ECW championship reactivated by WWE for the new brand. However, the title history was published by WWE on its website.

Title reigns were determined either by professional wrestling matches with different tag teams (a duo of wrestlers) or stables (a group of more than two wrestlers) using ring names, involved in pre-existing scripted feuds or were awarded the title due to scripted circumstances; the championship could have also been vacated by the promotion. Wrestlers were portrayed as either villains or heroes as they followed a series of tension-building events, which culminated in a wrestling match or series of matches for the championship.

The title was mostly won at live events in eight American states. The inaugural champions were The Super Destroyers (A. J. Petrucci and Doug Stahl), who won a tournament final at a live event to win the titles on June 23, 1992. Danny Doring and Roadkill, who won the titles on December 3, 2000 at the Massacre on 34th Street pay-per-view event, were the final wrestlers to have held the championship before ECW filed for bankruptcy. At 283 days, The Super Destroyers' first reign was the longest, while The Dudley Boyz' eighth reign and the team of Raven and Stevie Richards' second reign were the shortest, at less than one day. With eight reigns, The Dudley Boyz held the most reigns as a tag team and individually. Overall, there were 51 reigns among 31 teams.

Reigns

Names

Reigns

Combined reigns

By team

By wrestler

References 

 General
 
 
 Specific

External links 
 ECW World Tag Team Championship at www.wrestling-titles.com
 ECW World Tag Team Championship at WWE.com

Extreme Championship Wrestling championships
Professional wrestling tag team champion lists